

Intendants

See also
Regions of Chile

References

Government of Chile
Political office-holders in Chile
Regional intendants of Chile